The Range Rover, code-named L460, is the fifth generation Range Rover from the Land Rover marque. It was revealed by Jaguar Land Rover (JLR) in London on 26 October 2021. The car is available in two different wheelbases, as a plug-in hybrid (PHEV), and with a seven-seat option.

Overview
The fifth generation Range Rover was revealed on 26 October 2021 by the Jaguar Land Rover Chief Creative Officer and the car's designer, Gerry McGovern, at the Royal Opera House in London. It is built on JLR's new MLA-Flex platform, will be available as a PHEV and with a seven-seat option. As well as two PHEV, three diesel and two petrol JLR 3.0 L Ingenium I6 engine options, the car will be the first from JLR to use an engine developed under the combustion and electrified powertrain partnership agreed between JLR and BMW in 2019, the 4.4L BMW/JLR V8 engine. It launched with a range of mild hybrid (MHEV) diesel and petrol engines, with PHEVs due in early 2022 and an all-electric model in 2024. Buyers can also specify the four-seater arrangement that includes a centre console dividing the two rear seats along with an electrically operated tray table and a mini-fridge.

Specifications

Dimensions

Powertrain 
The following engine options are available:

All engines are coupled with an eight-speed automatic gearbox with a low-range capability, and supply power to the wheels through an all-wheel-drive system which can decouple the front axle to improve efficiency under certain driving conditions. The plug-in hybrid variants use a 38.2-kilowatt-hour lithium-ion battery (with 31.8 kWh usable).

References

External links

 Official USA website

Land Rover vehicles
Cars introduced in 2021
2020s cars
Full-size sport utility vehicles
Luxury sport utility vehicles
Euro NCAP large off-road
All-wheel-drive vehicles
Flagship vehicles
Plug-in hybrid vehicles
Vehicles with four-wheel steering